is a Japanese manga artist. Her debut work was a one volume manga titled Tennen Yuuryouji. Many of her works are serialized in Enix magazines, with collected volumes published by Square Enix. Her series KAMUI has been translated and published in English by Broccoli Books beginning in 2005. Her latest series, Sengoku Strays, was featured in the inaugural issue of Square Enix's new magazine, Gangan Joker. According to her English-language publisher, Nanami is ambidextrous, but draws her manga only with her left hand.

Works

References

External links 
 (archive) 

Living people
Manga artists
Year of birth missing (living people)